Miloš Šimončič (born 27 May 1987) is a former Slovak football midfielder who plays for OFK 1948 Veľký Lapáš.

Career

Club career
Šimončič have played for Nitra, spending most of his career there. He had also played for Austrian lower division side of Ritzing.

His professional retirement was announced on 21 January 2020. He would continue to play for OFK 1948 Veľký Lapáš and still be a part of FC Nitra's organization.

References

External links
FC Nitra profile 

1987 births
Living people
Slovak footballers
Slovak expatriate footballers
Association football midfielders
FC Nitra players
SC Ritzing players
OFK 1948 Veľký Lapáš players
Slovak Super Liga players
Sportspeople from Nitra
Expatriate footballers in Austria
Slovak expatriate sportspeople in Austria